Princess Bee (real name Benedetta Paravia), is a singer/songwriter, soprano, philanthropist, presenter and producer, born in Italy but well known also in Middle East countries for her humanitarian effort and her institutional projects.

Biography
Her first medal was at the age of 8 when she donated her poem "Le farfalle" to Pope John Paul II.
At the same age she also started painting with water and oil colors and exposed in Cento Pittori a Via Margutta. In 2001 she received the Gold Medal from the Argentinian Artists of the Cultural Center Borges Museum in Buenos Aires for her oil painting “5 March 2001”. In 2005 she organized and directed the "U.A.E. - Italy Economic Partnership Forum" in Fiera Milano Congressi Center to strength the political and economical relationship between the United Arab Emirates and Italy. The forum was opened by H.H. Shaikha Lubna Khalid Al Qasimi , U.A.E. Minister of Economy and several Italian authorities with the participation of the Chambers of Commerce of both countries.

In 2006 she wrote the lyrics of the song "Angels", music by Tiziano Bernardini, Emiliano Palmieri e Mario Parruccini. The song talks about two young girls, the Israeli Rachel Levy and the Palestinian Ayat Al Akras, who died in 2002 during a kamikaze attack in a supermarket.
"Angels" is the first and the only one song which has received the patronage of UNESCO (Commissione Nazionale Italiana) as of fundamental importance for peace and solidarity between populations. The song also received the patronage of the Holy See and the Medal of the President of the Italian Republic Giorgio Napolitano.
She was the youngest main speaker at the International conference "Women as global leaders" opened by Queen Rania of Jordan at its first edition.
Since 2005 she is the Project Manager of "The Intercultural Project", an educational program made for Emirati students which supports Emiratization  with the Patronage of the U.A.E. Ministry of Higher Education, the Embassy of Italy in the U.A.E. and the U.A.E. Embassy in Italy.

In 2008 she founded Angels Onlus, a humanitarian, Not for Profit, organization that takes care in Italy of sick children living in areas afflicted by the war or where there are no appropriate health care centers. The honorary President of Angels onlus is Her Royal Highness Princess Al Johara Al Saud.

In 2008 she created a special jewel for charity, called "Brotherhood" representing the symbols of the 3 monotheistic religions in chronological order, to remember that Jews, Christians and Muslims are all descending from Patriarch Abraham.
For this jewel of peace, she refused the proposal of a Royal family member who asked her to remove from the jewel the Jews's star in exchange of 2M of USD, but she refused to remove the star.
She has been a staunch supporter of Middle East peace and stability. 
In 2010 in the Campidoglio in Rome, she officially launched her international initiative "Music for Solidarity" inviting artists from all over the world to contribute with their music in the humanitarian causes.

In 2010, while she was the youngest associate of the Marisa Bellisario Foundation, being part of the Legal Group of the same, she collaborated in the drafting of the Statute of Roma Capitale, established in 2010 in implementation of Article 114 paragraph 3 of the Constitution, supplanting the pre-existing Municipality of Rome. 
In 2011 she collaborated in the drafting of the law proposal on gender quotas which was then implemented in law 120/2011 thanks to the efforts and will of Senator Lella Golfo.  

She organized and participated in missions of Peace both in Lebanon and Kossovo with Esercito Italiano Army Forces Leonte 8 and Leonte 9 (UNIFIL) where she personally collected medicines in Italy in favor of the needing population. The Italian Government officially authorised her to use the national Falcon 900 flights for all her missions.
In 2010 she renewed the Al Amal orphanage in Gaza with the cooperation of the Italian Government.

In 2013 she was appointed international goodwill ambassador  of the Al Noor Training Center for Children with Special Needs donated by the ruler of Dubai Shaikh Mohammed bin Rashid Al Maktoum by the benefaction of his wife Princess Haya bint Al Hussein of Jordan. She was volunteering for a year, accomplishing the mission of bringing new donations to the institution.

She has been supported by main Italian authorities and personalities to become Ambassador of UNESCO for Italy.

She is the co-author and producer of "Hi Dubai" TV format which she wrote to sponsor the city lifestyle and main events to attract young people to visit and to live in Dubai. "Hi Dubai" is part of 3 seasons (Hi Emirates and Hi Emirates Expo) translated in 7 languages, on air on Dubai One TV, online on Dubai Post and inflight on ICE of Emirates Airlines.

In 2019 she produced the second TV, web and inflight series "Hi Emirates", dedicated to the women achievers of the U.A.E. and to the valuable contribution to the women community of H.H. Sheikha Fatma bint Mubarak, known as Umm Al Emaraat. The series is also showcasing the amenities and the tourism attraction of all the 7 Emirates.

As author and producer she presents instances of Islamic hospitality, generosity and inclusiveness starting from the UAE, a country that is modelling the way to a more cohesive and harmonious society. She is focusing on the U.A.E. pluralism which offers dignity and respect to a diverse population underlining the role of women in an authentic Islamic nation. She is considered an active factor of the "Arab global Renaissance".

Musician activities
Sounds and words of Princess Bee songs found their origins in her travels around the world and have been especially affected by her love for the Middle East where she has worked with the local governments in the field of health, education  and media production  and as well she was modelling for many international fashion brands like Cartier and Dior. In 2005, she has collaborated in writing some international music project in Los Angeles.

"Shock me" is a song inspired by a personal experience and talks about the story of a guy jealous and obsessed by his girlfriend so that he starts to hate her.

"Shock me" video clip has been on air on MTV Arabia, Melody Hits TV and Ghanam. It has been awarded at the 67th Venice Film Festival during the show Il cinema incontra la musica.

In October 2010 Princess Bee has been awarded during the 8th edition of Roma Video Clip . Starting from October 2010, "Shock me" is also on air on several Italian networks.

By 1 January 2012 Princess Bee had released the new single "Touch my skin" through music web portals like iTunes, Amazon, Google Music, Facebook and Last.FM. "Touch my skin" is a dance song, aiming to put the message across of how today's society gives in to the promotion of false values. "Touch my skin" video has been filmed in modern London where she plays as a vampire carefully selecting her victims and making them slaves for her privileged circle. 
The story is an allegory about the corrupt part of society that refers to false values such as luxury, aesthetics and power, abusing the minds of those who are weakest and most vulnerable.

In September 2012 she released the single "Loving heart" a tribute to Rome, the Eternal city. It talks about the story of a teen confused by the choice between two guys, one rich and spoiled and one simple but truly able to love her.

In 2014 it was announced the new single "Emaraat", a song she dedicated to the United Arab Emirates in collaboration with Nicola Volpi which is the first international tribute for the country in memory of Shaikh Zayed bin Sultan Al Nahyan first President of the U.A.E. The song has been released in November 2014, before the National day and is a duetto with Harbi Al Amri  and has been produced in Fayez Al Saeed studio in Dubai by Hussam Kamil. The Arabic lyrics are written by the Emarati National poet Ali Al Khawar. For some weeks Emaraat has been an unbeaten best seller in the Virgin Megastores for both categories Arabic and International.

In December 2020 she released in Cairo “Tres Veces Latio’”, a remix in Spanish-Arabic of the Abu famous song “3Daqat” with Mazzika records. She filmed the video in Italy immediately after the lockdown for Pandemic COVID and she also directed it.

In January 2022 she launched with Guy Manoukian “Only Dubai” a song dedicated to Dubai after her 20 years of love for the city with Sony Columbia. The song has been the theme song of the Dubai Fashion season in March.

References

External links 
My Space Profile
Youtube Channel
Press
Love Angels
Benedetta Paravia

Living people
Italian songwriters
Year of birth missing (living people)